Peristernia reincarnata is a species of sea snail, a marine gastropod mollusk in the family Fasciolariidae, the spindle snails, the tulip snails and their allies.

Description
The shell size varies between 18 mm and 34 mm and has a maximum width of 11.8 mm

Distribution
This species can be found in the Red Sea, the Indian Ocean and in the Pacific Ocean off the Philippines, Papua New Guinea, the Northern Territory and Western Australia.

References

  Martin Avery Snyder (2000), Nomenclatural emendations in the family Fasciolariidae (Mollusca, Gastropoda), Proceedings of the Academy of natural Sciences of Philadelphia 150, 173–179

External links
 

Fasciolariidae
Gastropods described in 2000